The 1997 Dixie Crystals Grand Prix was the fourth race of the 1997 PPG/Firestone Indy Lights Championship Powered By Buick. The race took place on May 18 in Savannah, Georgia, United States, on Grand Prize of America Road Course parkland circuit on Hutchinson Island; a river island in the Savannah River, north of downtown Savannah. The race was won by Hélio Castroneves for Tasman Motorsports. Sérgio Paese finished second ahead of Lee Bentham, Luiz Garcia Jr., and Naoki Hattori.

Report

Background

In the 1990s, a group of local businessmen formed the Colonial Motorsport company, deciding it was time to bring back international racing action to Savannah. Major international races had last been held on the streets of Savannah with the American Grand Prize in 1908, 1910, and 1911; and the Vanderbilt Cup Race in 1911. After four years of careful negotiations, an agreement was reached for a stand-alone Indy Lights race, with follow up events in '98 and '99 offering the possibility of a future CART round. Public monies helped build a 1.965-mile county road to serve as a 10-turn circuit; the first time a public road had been pre-designed with the intention of also using it for racing in the USA.

Mark Blundell quoted, after a feasibility test for future CART races, "As a drivers track, it's good, It's quite demanding and really physical. It's a fun circuit to drive, and there are at least two and possibly three spots for overtaking. It doesn't have a street course feel, it's more of a road course feel. From a spectator viewpoint, there are plenty of great vantage points."

The event looked like a modest success; drivers seemed happy with the course, fans turned out in reasonable numbers, and a contract was in place for future years. However, creditors and several companies involved in the construction didn't want to give the promoters a reasonable time frame to make the event profitable. The resulting lawsuit threw Colonial Motorsport company into Chapter 11, and all its contracts, including the one with CART, were dissolved. The track itself came into public ownership and fell into disrepair.

Classification

Indy Lights

Notes:
All teams used a Normally-Aspirated Buick V6 engine producing 425 hp, and the Lola T97/20 chassis.

Support Races

North American Touring Car Championship

Barber Dodge Pro Series

USAC Formula Ford 2000

References

Dixie Crystals Grand Prix
Dixie Crystals Grand Prix
History of Savannah, Georgia
Dixie Crystals Grand Prix